Anekes affinis is a species of sea snail, a marine gastropod mollusk, unranked in the superfamily Seguenzioidea.

Description
The shell grows to  a height of 1.5 mm.
The rather thin, white shell is narrowly umbilicated. It is semitransparent glossy and lacks any sculpture,  The four whorls are  swollen and rapidly increasing. The periphery is simple and acute. The suture is narrow but deep.

Distribution
This species occurs in the Mediterranean Sea

References

 Jeffreys J. G., 1878-1885: On the mollusca procured during the H. M. S. "Lightning" and "Porcupine" expedition; Proceedings of the Zoological Society of London; Part 1 (1878): 393-416 pl. 22–23. Part 2 (1879): 553-588 pl. 45-46 [October 1879]. Part 3 (1881): 693-724 pl. 61. Part 4 (1881): 922-952 pl. 70-71 [1882]. Part 5 (1882): 656-687 pl. 49-50 [1883]. Part 6 (1883): 88-115 pl. 19–20. Part 7 (1884): 111-149 pl. 9–10. Part 8 (1884): 341-372 pl. 26–28. Part 9 (1885): 27-63 pl. 4-6

External links
  Serge GOFAS, Ángel A. LUQUE, Joan Daniel OLIVER,José TEMPLADO & Alberto SERRA (2021) - The Mollusca of Galicia Bank (NE Atlantic Ocean); European Journal of Taxonomy 785: 1–114
 

affinis
Gastropods described in 1883